Maurice Polard (19 September 1932, Guipavas (Finistère) is a French novelist and short stories writer. After his childhood at Treflez, he continued his studies in Lesneven then Brest and Rennes where he obtained the agrégation of English. He made his career as a teacher at Landerneau and Brest.

His first novel, La Saison du maître, very much noticed at the time, recalled the war school in Britain in the mid-1980s.

Bibliography 
1985: La Saison du maître, Gallimard, Prix Julien Dubreuil of the Académie française 1985 and Prix Français de La Table Ronde 1986
1988: Le Naufrageur, Gallimard, Grand Prix des Ecrivains de l'Ouest 1988 and Prix Bretagne 1988 
1990: Le Château du vent, Éditions Gallimard
1996: Le Préau des rois, Picollec
1999: Confession d'un matin de Pâques on Gallica, Ouest-France
2006: Molto tristamente, artist's book with an unpublished text by Maurice Polard and 5 engravings by Anick Butré, Editions du Capricorne

Maurice Polard also wrote the preface to the book by Jean-Louis Potier: FINISTERE SAUVAGE (Rue des Scribes Editions), a book of photographs in black and white on the landscapes of Finistère.

External links 
 Le site d'Anick Butré, artiste ayant signé avec Maurice Polard Molto tristamente
 Maurice Polard on the site of the Académie française

People from Finistère
1932 births
Living people
20th-century French non-fiction writers
Writers from Brittany